Argo Point is a scoria cone in Jason Peninsula, Antarctica, at a height of  above sea level.

Potassium-argon dating has indicated ages of 1.4-0.9 mya. The cone is constructed from basalt and hawaiite including lava bombs in its sides. Similar to Seal Nunataks and James Ross Island the rocks of Argo Point are ocean island basalts. This volcanism may be the consequence of back-arc effects of subduction along the South Shetland trench.

See also
 List of volcanoes in Antarctica

References 

Pleistocene volcanoes
Volcanoes of Graham Land
Oscar II Coast